Sree Narayanapuram Thrikkayil Temple (Malayalam: ശ്രീ നാരായണപുരം തൃക്കയിൽ ക്ഷേത്രം) is one of the oldest temples in Perissery. The divine idol installed here represents the world–enchanting form of Krishna endowed with the four lustrous arms carrying the conch, the discus, the mace, and the lotus. Adorned with the divine Thulasi garland and pearl necklaces, the idol represents the majestic form of Vishnu as revealed to Vasudeva and Devaki at the time of Krishnavatharam.

Gallery

External links

 Official Website
 Official Facebook Page

See also

 Temples of Kerala
 Temple festivals of Kerala
 List of places of worship in Chengannur

Hindu temples in Alappuzha district